David García Dapena (born 30 September 1977 in Marín, Pontevedra) is a retired Spanish professional road bicycle racer.

Doping
During the 2010 Vuelta a España he tested positive for EPO. A later sample also tested positive for HES. The Spanish Cycling Federation subsequently banned him for 2 years, effective 6 October 2010, and declared his results of the 2010 Vuelta a España void. After retiring, García disclosed information to the police about how he had acquired the product, and led to the arrest of Alberto Beltrán Niño in March 2012.

Major results

 2000
 1st, Stage 8, Volta a Portugal do Futuro
 2001
 1st, Stage 4, GP Philips
 2003
 1st, Stage 2, GP Castanhede
 1st, Stage 1, GP Abimota
 1st, Stage 4, GP Abimota
 2004
 1st, Stage 4, Volta a Terras de Santa Maria
 1st, Stage 2, Volta a Tras os Montes
 2005
 1st, Stage, GP Abimota
 2006
 1st, Stage, Volta a Terras de Santa Maria
 2008
 1st, Overall, Presidential Cycling Tour of Turkey
 1st, Stage 15, Vuelta a España
 2009
 1st, Stage 2, Presidential Cycling Tour of Turkey
 1st, Vuelta a La Rioja

References 

1977 births
Living people
Sportspeople from Marín, Pontevedra
Cyclists from Galicia (Spain)
Spanish Vuelta a España stage winners
Doping cases in cycling
Spanish sportspeople in doping cases
Presidential Cycling Tour of Turkey winners
Presidential Cycling Tour of Turkey stage winners
Spanish male cyclists